Imamzade Halil Pasha (also known as Osmancıklı Imamzade Halil Pasha) was an Ottoman statesman. He was grand vizier of the Ottoman Empire from 1406 to 1413.

His son, Koca Mehmed Nizamüddin Pasha, also served as grand vizier. His title Imamzade means Son of an Imam in Persian.

References 

15th-century Grand Viziers of the Ottoman Empire
People from Osmancık
Turks from the Ottoman Empire
People of the Ottoman Interregnum